The 1989 Intercontinental Final was the fifteenth running of the Intercontinental Final as part of the qualification for the 1989 Speedway World Championship. The 1989 Final was run on 13 August at the Odsal Stadium in Bradford, England, and was the last qualifying stage for riders from Scandinavia, the USA and from the Commonwealth nations for the World Final to be held at the Olympic Stadium in Munich, West Germany.

Intercontinental Final
 13 August
  Bradford, Odsal Stadium
 Qualification: Top 11 plus 1 reserve to the World Final in Munich, West Germany

*Troy Butler replaced the injured Sam Ermolenko. Martin Dugard came in as the reserve rider.

References

See also
 Motorcycle Speedway

1989
World Individual